Daphné Bürki (born Daphné de Montmarin, 2 March 1980, in Paris) is a French television presenter, columnist, stylist, and actress. She currently appears as one of the main judges on the competition series Drag Race France.

Filmography

Cinema
2008 : Deux jours à tuer, directed by Jean Becker : Bérengère
2010 : Un heureux événement, directed by Rémi Bezançon : Katia
2012 : David et Madame Hansen, directed by Alexandre Astier : Perrine
2014 : Les Yeux jaunes des crocodiles, directed by Cécile Telerman : elle-même

Television
 Drag Race France

References

External links 

  

French television presenters
Fashion stylists
French actresses
École des Beaux-Arts alumni
Mass media people from Paris
1980 births
Living people
French women television presenters
Drag Race France
Lycée Fénelon Sainte-Marie alumni